Vitaly Kukhinovich Daraselia (9 January 1957 – 13 December 1982) was a Georgian football player.

Playing career

Club
Daraselia was born to a Georgian father and Abkhaz mother on 9 January 1957. His birth date was later changed by Soviet sports officials to 9 October 1957 so that he could play longer for the national junior team. Daraselia also played for FC Dinamo Tbilisi and Soviet Union senior national team. He scored a winning goal for FC Dinamo Tbilisi in 1981, in the final game of the UEFA Cup Winners' Cup, rushing into the penalty area past two defenders, just 3 minutes before the full-time whistle.

International
In 1982 he played his only World Cup.

Personal life
His son, Vitaly Daraselia Jr. (born 1978), also played internationally as an association football midfielder, while his daughter Christina became a football official. In September 1978, when FC Dinamo Tbilisi was going to play against SSC Napoli in Italy, Vitaly's wife was expecting their second child. Before the game Daraselia told his teammates, that he would name his son after the one who would score the goal. Vitaly scored himself.

Death
Daraselia died in a traffic accident on 13 December 1982 when his car plunged from a mountain cliff into a river. His body was carried away by the river and was completely buried in sand. It was found 13 days later using a search and rescue dog.

Legacy

The stadium in Daraselia's home town of Ochamchire in Georgia bears his name. In December 2009, Daraselia's mother reported that the footballer's house-museum in Ochamchire was plundered and burned down.

References

External links

 pictures of Vitali Daraselia
 

1957 births
1982 deaths
People from Ochamchira District
Footballers from Abkhazia
Soviet footballers
Footballers from Georgia (country)
1982 FIFA World Cup players
Soviet Union international footballers
FC Dinamo Tbilisi players
Soviet Top League players
Road incident deaths in Georgia (country)
Road incident deaths in the Soviet Union
Association football midfielders
Honoured Masters of Sport of the USSR